Langworthy was an electoral ward of Salford City Council, in North-West England, located in the constituency of Salford and Eccles. A profile of the ward conducted by Salford City Council in 2014 recorded a population of 12,980.

The ward was abolished in 2021 as part of a boundary review conducted by the Local Government Boundary Commission for England.

Councillors 
The ward was represented by three councillors elected for four year terms.

 indicates seat up for re-election.
 indicates seat won in a by-election.

Elections in 2010s

May 2019

May 2018

By-election December 2017

May 2016

May 2015

May 2014

May 2012

May 2011

May 2010

Elections in 2000s

References 

Salford City Council Wards